V Recordings is a drum and bass record label, based in the United Kingdom. It was founded in 1993 by Bryan Gee and Jumpin Jack Frost.

History
Founded in 1993 through the friendship of Bryan Gee and Jumpin Jack Frost, the label is one of longest-running labels and has launched the recording careers of the likes of Roni Size, Krust, and DJ Die.

Gee, originally from Gloucester, was particularly excited by the "Bristol Sound" and working as A&R at a record label at the time, heard some of Roni Size and Krust's early material. Gee and Frost would make the trip to Bristol and decide to set up the label shortly after in order to release some of their music.

The label has released classics of the genre such as "Set Speed" by Krust, "Fresh" by Roni Size, and "Brand New Funk" by Adam F.

The labels biggest commercial success was "LK (Carolina Carol Bela)" by DJ Marky featuring Stamina MC - which reached #17 in the UK Singles Chart in July 2002.

It has also spawned a number of sub-labels including Philly Blunt, Chronic, and Liquid V. Gee continues to operate the label.

V Recordings artists
These include:
 Adam F
 Alix Perez
 Artificial Intelligence
 Calibre
 Dillinja
 DJ Die
 DJ Marky
 DJ Patife
 DJ Suv
 Ed Rush
 Goldie
 Krust
 Lemon D
 Optical
 Peshay
 Ray Keith
 Roni Size
 Serum
 Scorpio
 Social Misfits

Discography

Selected singles/EPs
Roni Size - It's A Jazz Thing (1994)
Roni Size & DJ Die - The Calling (1994)
Krust - Jazz Note (1994)
Roni Size - All Crew Must Big Up (1995)
DJ Die & DJ Suv - Out of Sight (1995)
Krust - Set Speed (1995)
Lemon D - I Can't Stop /Changes (1995)
Krust - Angles (1996)
Roni Size - Dayz (1996)
Krust - Warhead (1997)
Scorpio - Li Li (1997)
Adam F - Brand New Funk (1998)
Ray Keith - Do It / The Reckoning (1998)
Roni Size - Strictly Social (1999)
Dillinja - Grimey (2002)
DJ Marky feat Stamina MC - LK (2002)
Peshay - Solina / How We Used To Live (2011)

Compilations
V Classic''' (1997)Planet V (1999)V Forever (2002)Return To V (2004)Retrospect Vol 1 (2007)Bryan Gee Presents: Future'' (2020)

See also
 List of record labels
 List of jungle and drum n bass record labels
 Drum and bass

References

External links
 Official site

British record labels
Drum and bass record labels
Record labels established in 1993